The Presidential Range is a mountain range located in the White Mountains of the U.S. state of New Hampshire. Containing the highest peaks of the Whites, its most notable summits are named for American presidents, followed by prominent public figures of the 18th and 19th centuries. The Presidential Range is notorious for having some of the worst weather on Earth, mainly because of the unpredictability of high wind speeds and whiteout conditions on the higher summits. Because of the poor weather conditions, the Presidential Range is often used for mountaineering training for those who go on to climb some of the world's highest mountains, including K2 and Everest.

The range is almost entirely in Coos County.

Notable summits
The highest mountains in the Presidential Range are named principally for U.S. presidents, with the tallest mountain (Mount Washington) named for the first president and the second tallest (Mount Adams) for the second president.

Among the range's most notable summits (in sequence from southwest to northeast):
 Mount Webster — after Daniel Webster
 Mount Jackson* — after Charles Thomas Jackson (19th-century geologist)
 Mount Pierce* — after Franklin Pierce (formerly Mt. Clinton — after DeWitt Clinton)
 Mount Eisenhower* — after Dwight D. Eisenhower
 Mount Franklin — after Benjamin Franklin
 Mount Monroe* — after James Monroe
 Mount Washington* — after George Washington (a general at time of naming in 1784, and only later a president)
 Mount Clay — after Henry Clay (State of New Hampshire changed name to Mount Reagan after Ronald Reagan; U.S. government still recognizes Clay name)
 Mount Jefferson* — after Thomas Jefferson
 Mount Sam Adams — after Samuel Adams
 Mount Adams* — after John Adams
 Mount Quincy Adams — after John Quincy Adams
 Mount Madison* — after James Madison

Mount Adams has four subsidiary peaks besides its summit that are also commonly recognized by name. Two are listed above (Sam Adams and John Quincy Adams). The third and fourth are:
Mount Abigail Adams (formerly Adams IV)
Adams V

The summits marked with an asterisk (*) are included on the peak bagging list of 4,000-foot and higher mountains in New Hampshire; the others are excluded, in some cases because of lesser height and in others because of more technical criteria.

Other summits 

Aside from the notable summits, the Presidential Range contains a number of additional named peaks. Several of these peaks, drained on their west faces by the Dry River, are less accessible than the main and most-visited ridge of the range.

Subsidiary peaks of Mount Washington:
 Ball Crag (6,106 ft)
 Nelson Crag (5,620 ft)
 Boott Spur (5,500 ft)

North from Mount Washington:
 Mount Bowman (3,449 ft) (spur of Mount Jefferson)

South from Mount Washington:
 Engine Hill (3,100 ft)
 Maple Mountain (2,601 ft)
 Iron Mountain (2,726 ft)
 Montalban Ridge:
 Mount Isolation (4,004 ft)*
 Mount Davis (3,819 ft)
 Stairs Mountain (3,463 ft)
 Mount Resolution (3,415 ft)
 Bemis Ridge:
 Mount Crawford (3,119 ft)
 Mount Hope (2,505 ft)
 Mount Parker (3,004 ft)
 Mount Langdon (2,390 ft)
 Mount Pickering (1,945 ft) (family name of first president of Appalachian Mountain Club)
 Mount Stanton (1,716 ft)

The summits marked with an asterisk (*) are included on the peak-bagging list of 4,000-foot and higher mountains in New Hampshire; the others are excluded, in some cases because of lesser height and in others because of more technical criteria.

Watersheds
The Presidentials separate drainage via the Saco and Androscoggin rivers into the Atlantic Ocean on the coast of Maine, from drainage into the Israel and Ammonoosuc rivers, thence into the Connecticut River, and thence into Long Island Sound.

Presidential Traverse
It can be done in a single day in summer, but during winter it is generally a two- to four-day venture. The traverse is considered strenuous.

Hazards

The range is notorious for its unpredictable and inclement weather, with some of the deadliest mountains in the continental United States. Due to its unique location relative to other geographic features, it holds the world record for highest recorded surface wind speed not within a tropical cyclone. Fatalities in this area are dominated by those that occur on Mount Washington, the highest peak in the range.  The New Hampshire Fish and Game Department conducts an average of 200 rescues a year for hikers in need of assistance.

See also
 List of people who died on the Presidential Range

References

External links 
TrailsNH.com - Current trail conditions for the Presidential Range, compiled daily

Mountain ranges of New Hampshire
White Mountains (New Hampshire)
Landforms of Coös County, New Hampshire
White Mountain National Forest